Goodwell may refer to:

Goodwell, Oklahoma
Goodwell Township, Michigan
Goodwell Clothing Company, "looking good, living well"